Tøsedrengene were a Danish band that existed from 1978 to 1986, notable for their mix of pop-rock and reggae with Danish-language lyrics. During their active years, they achieved great success in Denmark, their six studio albums selling more than a million copies. The name translates to "The sissy boys", which is a parodic reference to the 70's anti masculine climate in Denmark.

Discography

Studio albums 
 Det går fremad (1979)
 Tiden står stille (1981)
 Tøsedrengene 3 (1982)
 Alle vore håb (1983)
 Tiden er klog (1984)
 I sikre hænder (1985)
 ''Sig du kan li mig / De 40 bedste sange (2014)

References

External links 
 Danser med Drenge history: Tøsedrengene
 
 Tøsedrengene, official website

Danish pop music groups
Musical groups established in 1978
Musical groups disestablished in 1986